Okęcie Warszawa is a Polish sporting club from the Okęcie neighbourhood of Warsaw. Founded in 1929 as Skoda Warszawa, its name was changed to Okęcie in 1936. The club is located at 1 Radarowa Street in Warsaw. Its colors are blue-white.

Okęcie is most famous for its boxers (including Antoni Czortek), who in the 1930s were multiple champions of Poland, including the team championship of the country (1934), and its soccer team, which played in the Polish 3rd Division. Currently the soccer team plays in the 4th regional Division of Mazovia.

Sports clubs established in 1929
Football clubs in Warsaw
Association football clubs established in 1929
1929 establishments in Poland